The swimming competition at the 1973 Summer Universiade took place in Moscow, USSR in August 1973.

Men's events

Legend:

Women's events

Legend:

References
Medalist Summary (Men) on GBRATHLETICS.com
Medalist Summary (Women) on GBRATHLETICS.com
USA Swimming Roster

1973 in swimming
Swimming at the Summer Universiade
1973 Summer Universiade
Swimming in the Soviet Union